Underwater volcano may refer to:
Subaqueous volcano, a volcano that forms under a lake
Submarine volcano, a volcano that forms under an ocean

See also
 Subglacial volcano